Mitford may refer to:

People 
 Mitford family
 Algernon Freeman-Mitford, 1st Baron Redesdale (1837–1916), British diplomat, collector and writer, he was the paternal grandfather of the Mitford sisters
 Bertram Mitford (novelist) (1855–1914), prolific writer of adventure stories, most set in Africa
 Deborah Cavendish, Duchess of Devonshire (1920–2014), English aristocrat and writer
 Diana Mitford (1910–2003), widow of Oswald Mosley
 Eustace Reveley Mitford (1810–1869), settler and satirist "Pasquin" in South Australia
 Jessica Mitford (1917–1996), Anglo-American author, journalist and political campaigner
 Mary Russell Mitford (1787–1855), British author and playwright
 Mitford sisters: Nancy, Pamela, Diana, Unity Valkyrie, Jessica and Deborah
 Nancy Mitford (1904–1973), English novelist and biographer
 Unity Mitford (1914–1948), English supporter of fascism and Adolf Hitler
 William Mitford (1744–1827), English historian and the great-great-great-grandfather of the Mitford sisters

Places 
 Mitford, South Carolina
 Mitford, North Carolina, a fictional town that is the setting for The Mitford Years series by Jan Karon
 Mitford, Northumberland, England
 Mitford Castle
 Mitford Hall
 Mitford Old Manor House
 Mitford and Launditch hundred, Norfolk, England

Schools
 Mitford Hospital, Dhaka, Bangladesh
 Mitford Middle School, Cochrane, Alberta, Canada